The default speed limits in Israel are:

50 km/h on urban roads;
80 km/h on non-urban roads;
90 km/h on non-urban roads with a built-up dividing area;
100 km/h on Route 1, the highway between Tel Aviv and Jerusalem;
110 km/h on a small number of high-speed roads; and
120 km/h on Highway 6, the north–south toll road.

References

Israel
Road transport in Israel